Viburnum treleasei (Portuguese: folhado), the Azorean laurustinus, is a species in the genus Viburnum endemic to the Azores. It inhabits natural forests of Juniperus brevifolia, Laurus azorica and Ilex perado, Erica azorica, in sloping areas. Generally at altitudes above . It is present in eight of the nine islands.

References

treleasei
Endemic flora of the Azores